Chiefdom of Tsanlha, also known as Chiefdom of Lesser Jinchuan, was an autonomous Gyalrong chiefdom that ruled Lesser Jinchuan (present day Xiaojin County, Sichuan) during Qing dynasty. The rulers of Tsanlha used the royal title Tsanlha Gyalpo.

The chieftains of Tsanla were descendants of a Bon lama. He established the chiefdom in the end of the Ming dynasty. By the time of the Ming-Qing transition, he swore allegiance to Qing emperor, and was appointed Native Chieftain (Tusi).

Later, Tsanla came into conflict with Chiefdom of Chuchen (Greater Jinchuan). After Jinchuan campaigns, it was annexed by the Qing dynasty.

References

Tusi
History of Sichuan
Kham
States and territories established in 1650
States and territories disestablished in 1776